= Chilotrogus stoliczkae =

Scientific classification
- Kingdom: Animalia
- Phylum: Arthropoda
- Class: Insecta
- Order: Coleoptera
- Suborder: Polyphaga
- Infraorder: Scarabaeiformia
- Family: Scarabaeidae
- Genus: Chilotrogus
- Species: C. stoliczkae

Binomial name
- Chilotrogus stoliczkae (Sharp, 1878)

Synonyms
- Lachnosterna stoliczkae Sharp, 1878; Holotrichia planiceps Frey, 1973; Brahmina popei Frey, 1963; Articephala planifrons Moser, 1920; Brahmina fulgida Brenske, 1896

Species of beetle

Chilotrogus stoliczkae is a species of beetle of the family Scarabaeidae. It is found in India (Himachal Pradesh, Uttarakhand), Nepal and Pakistan.

== Description ==
Adults reach a length of about 13–16 mm. The upper and lower surfaces are blackish-brown, while the legs are reddish-brown. The upper surface and pygidium are shiny and smooth and the thorax has long hairs. The upper surface of the clypeus is coarsely and densely punctate, while the frons and vertex are less densely and coarsely punctate. The anterior margin of the pronotum has smooth marginal striations and the surface is finely and moderately densely punctate (slightly more densely on the sides). The elytra have three flat ribs and are coarsely and densely punctate.
